Navy Yard City is a census-designated place (CDP) in Kitsap County, Washington, United States. The population was 2,477 at the 2010 census.

History

Navy Yard City was established in 1909 and resisted several attempts at annexation from the City of Bremerton, which now surrounds the unincorporated community.

Geography
Navy Yard City is located in south-central Kitsap County at  (47.551717, -122.669000). It is bordered to the north, east, and west by the city of Bremerton and to the south, across Sinclair Inlet, by the city of Port Orchard, the Kitsap county seat. Washington State Route 3 passes through the west side of Navy Yard City, leading north  to Poulsbo and southwest  to Shelton.

Demographics
As of the census of 2000, there were 2,638 people, 1,151 households, and 645 families residing in the CDP. The population density was 4,408.7 people per square mile (1,697.6/km2). There were 1,264 housing units at an average density of 2,112.4/sq mi (813.4/km2). The racial makeup of the CDP was 76.8% White, 7.7% African American, 1.5% Native American, 5.2% Asian, 1.1% Pacific Islander, 2.3% from other races, and 5.3% from two or more races. Hispanic or Latino of any race were 6.4% of the population.

There were 1,151 households, out of which 27.5% had children under the age of 18 living with them, 39.8% were married couples living together, 12.6% had a female householder with no husband present, and 43.9% were non-families. 31.6% of all households were made up of individuals, and 8.4% had someone living alone who was 65 years of age or older. The average household size was 2.29 and the average family size was 2.87.

In the CDP, the population was spread out, with 23.3% under the age of 18, 15.3% from 18 to 24, 33.4% from 25 to 44, 18.1% from 45 to 64, and 10.0% who were 65 years of age or older. The median age was 30 years. For every 100 females, there were 105.1 males. For every 100 females age 18 and over, there were 101.4 males.

The median income for a household in the CDP was $36,285, and the median income for a family was $40,938. Males had a median income of $30,801 versus $21,875 for females. The per capita income for the CDP was $18,532. About 8.8% of families and 12.6% of the population were below the poverty line, including 16.3% of those under age 18 and 2.6% of those age 65 or over.

References

Census-designated places in Kitsap County, Washington
Census-designated places in Washington (state)